The women's hammer throw competition of the athletics events at the 2019 Pan American Games will take place on the 10 of August at the 2019 Pan American Games Athletics Stadium. The defending Pan American Games champion is Rosa Rodríguez from Venezuela.

Summary
Brooke Andersen took the lead with her first round 71.07m with Rosa Rodríguez in second place.  Andersen would not improve throughout the competition.  Rodríguez did improve with her second round 69.48m, but that was as far as she would go.  Gwen Berry's second round throw moved her from fourth place into the silver medal position.  Berry improved on her fourth throw but didn't get ahead of Andersen until her fifth round throw.  Berry put it all together for her final effort,  to win by over 3 and a half meters.

Awards ceremony
During the award ceremony, Berry cast worldwide attention for raising her fist during the National Anthem.  In what was seen as an extension of the National anthem protests, she called out against injustice in America "and a president who's making it worse."

Fencer Race Imboden also made a protest at the games, taking a knee on the award stand.

Records
Prior to this competition, the existing world and Pan American Games records were as follows:

Schedule

Results
All times shown are in meters.

Final
The results were as follows:

References

Athletics at the 2019 Pan American Games
2019